Sainte-Thérèse Assembly was a General Motors Canada automobile factory located in Sainte-Thérèse, Quebec.

History
The factory opened in 1966.  It was located in the Montreal suburb of Sainte-Thérèse, Quebec.  It later was the site for production of the F-body Chevrolet Camaro and Pontiac Firebird. The plant closed in 2002 and was demolished.

In the mid-1980s, the plant was facing closure due to high absenteeism and low quality of the G-body cars built there. However, a new labor pact and improved quality, plus the availability of government-backed interest-free loans, prompted GM to expand and modernize the facility. Production of the Cutlass Supreme and Grand Prix stopped in February 1987 and the plant was retooled to build the Chevrolet Celebrity, using equipment transferred from Oshawa.

The site (located at 2500 boulevard De la Grande-Allée) was purchased in 2004 and has been redeveloped as a commercial and residential site known as Faubourg Boisbriand and the Centre for Ice Excellence.

Models produced 

 Chevrolet Impala (1967–1972)
 Chevrolet Vega (1973–1974)
 Pontiac Astre (1973–1974)
 Buick Skyhawk (1975–1977)
 Chevrolet Monza (1975–1977)
 Oldsmobile Starfire (1975–1977)
 Pontiac Sunbird (1976–1977)
 Pontiac LeMans, Grand LeMans (1978–1981)
 Oldsmobile Cutlass (1978–1987)
 Pontiac Grand Prix (1978–1987)
 Pontiac Bonneville (1982–1986)
 Chevrolet Celebrity (1987–1989)
 Oldsmobile Cutlass Ciera (1988–1991)
 Chevrolet Camaro (1993–2002) 
 Pontiac Firebird (1993–2002) 

Notes

References

General Motors factories
Former motor vehicle assembly plants
Motor vehicle assembly plants in Canada
Buildings and structures in Laurentides
Sainte-Thérèse, Quebec
Buildings and structures demolished in 2002
1966 establishments in Quebec
2002 disestablishments in Quebec
Boisbriand
General Motors Canada